David Cortés may refer to:

David Cortés (politician) (1955–2015), Bolivian politician
David Cortés (baseball) (born 1973), Mexican baseball player
David Bonilla Cortés (born 1974), Puerto Rican politician
David Cortés (Spanish footballer) (born 1979), Spanish footballer
David Cortés (Colombian footballer) (born 1992), Colombian footballer